Brandon Cornell Jones is a former American Football wide receiver.  He played college football at Oklahoma. He was drafted by the Tennessee Titans in the third round of the 2005 NFL Draft. Jones also played for the San Francisco 49ers.

Baseball career
Jones was drafted by the New York Yankees in the 28th Round (845th overall pick) of June 2001 amateur entry draft; however, he did not sign.

Football career

Tennessee Titans
Jones was selected in the NFL Draft behind teammates Mark Clayton and Mark Bradley by the Tennessee Titans.

San Francisco 49ers
On February 28, 2009, he was signed by the San Francisco 49ers to a five-year, $16.5 million contract with $5.4 million in guaranteed money. He finished the season playing in eight games, recording his only reception of the season during the 49ers' week 13 loss to the Seattle Seahawks for 18 yards.

On August 18, 2010, he was released by the 49ers.

Seattle Seahawks
On August 22, 2010, he was signed by the Seattle Seahawks.

Baltimore Ravens
On February 12, 2011, he was signed by the Baltimore Ravens. He was released on September 3, 2011.

References

1982 births
Living people
People from Texarkana, Texas
Players of American football from Texas
African-American players of American football
American football wide receivers
Oklahoma Sooners baseball players
Oklahoma Sooners football players
Tennessee Titans players
San Francisco 49ers players
Seattle Seahawks players
21st-century African-American sportspeople
20th-century African-American people
Ed Block Courage Award recipients